Carnival in Coal is an extreme metal/avant-garde metal band from France. Founded in 1995, the band mixed death metal, black metal and other extreme metal genres with  genres such as easy listening, disco, and pop.

History
Originally, Carnival In Coal signed to and released their debut album through the now-defunct French indie label War On Majors Records. The band then released two albums through another French based independent Metal label, Season of Mist, and later signed a multi-album deal to Earache Records and their Elitist Records sub-label. The only album to come from this deal was 2005's Collection Prestige.

The band played its first live show in April 2006 at the Killer Fest in Chaulnes, France, and then went on to play several dates across Europe, including festivals like Hellfest Summer Open Air in France and Brutal Assault in Czech Republic.

Line-up

Band members
 Arno Strobl – vocals
 Axel Wursthorn – all instruments

Live members 
 Arno Strobl – vocals
 Axel Wursthorn – bass and samples
 Alexis Damien – drums
 Romain Caron – guitar and backing vocals
 Pierre Antonik – guitar
 Julien Cathalo – keyboard and samples
 Frédéric Leclercq – guitar
 El Worm – guitar
 Timmy Zecevic – keyboard and samples
 Nicolas Minier – guitar

Discography 
 Sramik (demo, 1997)
 Vivalavida (1999)
 French Cancan (1999)
 Fear Not (2001)
 Collection Prestige (2005)

External links 
 Official homepage
 [ Carnival in Coal] at Allmusic
 Official MySpace page

Musical groups established in 1995
Musical groups disestablished in 2007
French heavy metal musical groups
Avant-garde metal musical groups
Earache Records artists
French musical duos
Musical groups from Amiens